Campbellton is an unincorporated community in Atascosa County, Texas, United States. According to the Handbook of Texas, the community had an estimated population of 350 in 2000. Campbellton is part of the San Antonio Metropolitan Statistical Area.

History
An Irish immigrant, John F. Campbell, began the community in the 1860s by promoting settlement in the area. He was the first postmaster in the community when the post office was established in the 1870s. He also opened a general store in the community and held Catholic church services in his home. The population was 25 in 1894 but then grew to 30 in 1890. It had three churches, a gin, two livestock breeders, and a lumberyard during that same time. The community's population went down during the middle of the decade, but it gained a general store and another livestock breeder. There were seven cattle breeders in Campbellton in 1914 and the population returned to 30. Its success continued with the arrival of the San Antonio, Uvalde, and Gulf Railroad in 1912. Beekeepers started manufacturing honey in the community for commercial purposes in 1914. The population grew to 50 in 1925 and jumped to 368 in the 1950s and had an average of ten businesses operating. Oil was then discovered in the community in 1956, but ranching came to an end. Its population was 275 from the 1960s through 1990 and had three businesses at that time. The population was 350 in 2000 and had ten businesses. The community's welcome sign and Texas Escapes magazine state that the population in 1990 was 482. 

Although it is unincorporated, Campbellton has a post office with the ZIP code of 78008.

The Wild Man of the Navidad, one of the purported sightings of Bigfoot, was also filmed as a movie in Campbellton, in which locals appeared in small roles.

Geography
It is strategically located on a thoroughfare to the Rio Grande Valley. The alternate route of U.S. Route 281 also travels through the community.

Education
John F Campbell founded the community's first school in the 1870s. It had 30 students and one teacher in 1904 and then had 169 students ten years later. It had 240 students and seven teachers in 1938. Children who finished elementary school were sent to schools in Pleasanton for middle and high school. The community continues to be served by the Pleasanton Independent School District to this day.

References

Unincorporated communities in Texas
Unincorporated communities in Atascosa County, Texas
Greater San Antonio